All Saints High School is a Roman Catholic school established in 1885 in Hyderabad, India. It teaches students enrolled in lower kindergarten up to 10th grade.

History 
The history of All Saints High School dates back to 1855 when Rt. Rev. Daniel Murphy, the Vicar Apostolic of Hyderabad founded it at the request of the then-Nizam of Hyderabad, Fourth Asaf Nasirud Dowla Bahadur. Rt. Rev. Mgr. Caproti was appointed as its first rector in 1858.In 1932, the school was handed over to the Montfort Brothers of St. Gabriel.

At the invitation of Bishop Vismara of Hyderabad and on the insistence of His Holiness Pope Pius IX, the Montfort Brothers of St. Gabriel took charge of the management of the school in 1932 with Rev. Bro. Rosius as its first Brother Rector. In 1933, Rev. Bro. M. Paul, an administrator, took over as the first Indian rector and developed All Saints as one of the best secondary schools in academics and infrastructure in the Nizam’s dominion. With Independence in 1947, there came one of the school's most revered and well-known rectors, Rev. Bro. John of God. 

Due to inadequate accommodation, growing demands for admission, and to mark the Centenary Year of the Institution, four schools were branched out between 1953 and 1955, viz., St. Peter’s High School (housing the present primary sections), Little Flower High School, Hyderabad, St. Paul’s High School and St. Mark’s Boys Town. All Saints’ was an exclusively boys school until 1996 when it became co-educational. In 2011-2012, the kindergarten was renamed the All Saints’ Preparatory School.

In 2018, a minor fire broke out at the school campus. Seven children were admitted to the hospital due to breathing problems, but discharged the same day. There were no physical injuries or deaths.

Notable alumni 
The notable alumni of the school include:

 Mohammed Azharuddin, cricketer
 Noel David, cricketer
 Venkatapathy Raju, cricketer
Mohammed Irfan, singer
Sitaram Yechury, politician.

References 

Brothers of Christian Instruction of St Gabriel schools
Catholic secondary schools in India
Primary schools in India
Christian schools in Telangana
High schools and secondary schools in Hyderabad, India
Educational institutions established in 1855
1855 establishments in India